Nepenthosyrphus  is a genus of hoverflies in the subfamily Eristalinae.

Species
Nepenthosyrphus capitatus (Sack, 1931)
Nepenthosyrphus malayanus Hippa, 1978
Nepenthosyrphus meijerei Rotheray, 2012
Nepenthosyrphus oudemansi Meijere, 1932
Nepenthosyrphus venustus Thompson, 1971

References

Diptera of Asia
Hoverfly genera
Eristalinae
Taxa named by Johannes C. H. de Meijere